The 13th Annual Petit Le Mans powered by Mazda2 is the 13th running of the Petit Le Mans and the final round of the 2010 American Le Mans Series season.  The event also served as the second and penultimate round of the 2010 Intercontinental Le Mans Cup.  It took place at Road Atlanta, Georgia on October 2, 2010.

Qualifying

Qualifying result
Pole position winners in each class are marked in bold.

Race

Race result
Class winners marked in bold.

References

|-
! colspan="3" style="background: #FFFFFF;" |American Le Mans Series
|- style="text-align:center;" 
|width="35%" align="center"|Previous race:Grand Prix of Mosport
|width="30%" style="text-align: center;"|2010 season
|width="35%" align="center"|Next race:none
|-
! colspan="3" style="background: #FFFFFF;" |Intercontinental Le Mans Cup
|- style="text-align:center;" 
|width="35%" align="center"|Previous race:1000 km of Silverstone
|width="30%" style="text-align: center;"|2010 season
|width="35%" align="center"|Next race:1000 km of Zhuhai

Petit Le Mans
Petit Le Mans
2010 Intercontinental Le Mans Cup season